Easy is the fifth album by Kelly Willis. It was released on Rykodisc in 2002. The album went to number 29 on Top Country Albums.

Critical reception
Soon after Easy was released, NPR's Meredith Ochs said that Willis "has found her true style" on the album. Richard Harrington, a music critic for the Washington Post, ranked Easy as his 9th favorite album of 2002, writing that "Willis's originals, including the hurtin' anthems "If I Left You" and "Easy (As Falling Apart)," are among her best yet."

Track listing
"If I Left You" (Kelly Willis) – 3:09
"Easy (as Falling Apart)" (Willis) – 4:12
"What Did You Think" (Bruce Robison) – 3:34
"You Can't Take It with You" (Paul Kelly) – 3:03
"Getting to Me" (Willis, Gary Louris) – 4:32
"Don't Come the Cowboy with Me Sonny Jim!" (Kirsty MacColl) – 3:57
"Wait Until Dark" (Willis, John Leventhal) – 3:41
"Find Another Fool" (Marcia Ball) – 3:14
"Not What I Had in Mind" (Willis) – 4:07
"Reason to Believe" (Willis) – 3:17

Personnel 

Chris Burns – assistant engineer
Floyd Domino – piano
Tony Edwards – glockenspiel
Amy Farris – violin, viola, background vocals
Rafael Gayol – drums
Vince Gill – background vocals
Paul Glasse – mandolin
Robert Hadley – mastering
Thomas Johnson – assistant engineer
Steven Jurgensmeyer – design
Alison Krauss – background vocals
John Ludwick – bass guitar
Lloyd Maines – electric guitar, steel guitar
Ian McLagan – piano, Hammond organ, Wurlitzer
Gary Paczosa – producer, engineer, mixing
Chuck Prophet – acoustic guitar, electric guitar, wurlitzer
Bruce Robison – background vocals
Doug Sax – mastering
Mellissa Schleicher – make-up, hair stylist
Rolf Sieker – banjo
Mark Spencer – acoustic guitar, piano, electric guitar, bonang, national steel guitar, baritone guitar
Chris Thile – mandolin
Geoff Travis – executive producer
Dan Tyminski – background vocals
Dana Tynan – photography
Kelly Willis – lead vocals, producer, background vocals

Chart performance

References

Kelly Willis albums
2002 albums
Rykodisc albums